Amla Assembly constituency is one of the 230 Vidhan Sabha (Legislative Assembly) constituencies of Madhya Pradesh state in central India.

It is part of Betul District and is reserved for candidates of the Scheduled Castes.

Members of the Legislative Assembly

Election results

2018

See also
Amla, Madhya Pradesh
List of constituencies of the Madhya Pradesh Legislative Assembly
Betul district

References

Assembly constituencies of Madhya Pradesh
Betul district